Jan Swafford (born September 10, 1946) is an American author and composer. He earned his Bachelor of Arts magna cum laude from Harvard College and his M.M.A. and D.M.A. from the Yale School of Music. His teachers included Earl Kim at Harvard, Jacob Druckman at Yale, and Betsy Jolas at Tanglewood. He has written respected musical biographies of Charles Ives, Johannes Brahms, Ludwig van Beethoven, and Wolfgang Amadeus Mozart as well as the Vintage Guide to Classical Music. He appeared in the award-winning 2018 German documentary The Unanswered Ives.

Works
Swafford has written columns on music and other subjects in Slate, and is heard as a commentator on NPR and the BBC. He is a regular program annotator for orchestras and venues including the Boston Symphony, Cleveland Orchestra, Chicago Symphony, San Francisco Symphony, the Metropolitan Opera, and Carnegie Hall.

His writing honors include a 2012 Deems Taylor Award for internet writing and a Mellon Fellowship at Harvard. His Brahms and Ives biographies were end-of-year Critics' Choices in The New York Times. The Ives biography was nominated for a National Book Critics Circle award in biography and won the Pen-Winship prize for a book on a New England subject. His biography Beethoven: Anguish and Triumph in its first week appeared on the New York Times bestseller list.

He has taught at schools including Boston University, Amherst College, Tufts, and Boston Conservatory.

Swafford's music, which is highly lyrical and moves freely between tonality and atonality, has been called New Romantic in style. There are equal if less overt contributions from world music, especially Indian and Balinese, and from jazz and blues. The titles of his works reveal a steady inspiration from nature and landscape. The composer views his own work as a kind of classicism: a concern with clarity, directness, and expression, or as he puts it, "music that sounds familiar though it is new, works that sound like they wrote themselves."

Notable are his orchestral works Landscape with Traveler (1979–80), After Spring Rain (1981–82) and From the Shadow of the Mountain (2001), the piano quintet Midsummer Variations (1985), the piano quartet They Who Hunger (1989), and the piano trio They That Mourn (2002), the last in memoriam 9/11. In 2012 cellist Rhonda Rider premiered his solo cello work The Silence at Yuma Point, part of a commissioning project of pieces inspired by the Grand Canyon (where Swafford has been a frequent hiker). His compositional awards include a National Endowment for the Arts Composer Grant, two Massachusetts Artists Foundation Fellowships, and a Tanglewood Fellowship. His work is published by Peermusic Classical and Meridian Records.

Awards and honors
1997 L.L. Winship/PEN New England Award, Charles Ives: A Life With Music

Bibliography

References

External links

 Profile from Tufts University
"'Missa Solemnis', a Divine Bit of Beethoven", NPR commentary by Swafford

1946 births
Living people
Place of birth missing (living people)
American male classical composers
American classical composers
20th-century classical composers
21st-century classical composers
American music critics
Harvard University alumni
Yale School of Music alumni
Tufts University faculty
American biographers
Pupils of Earl Kim
Pupils of Jacob Druckman
21st-century American composers
20th-century American composers
20th-century American male musicians
21st-century American male musicians
American male biographers
20th-century American biographers
20th-century American male writers
20th-century American musicologists
21st-century American biographers
21st-century American male writers
21st-century American musicologists
Brahms scholars
Beethoven scholars
Mozart scholars